Benjamin John "Ben" Sharpe (born 31 July 1973) is a British former field hockey player who competed in the 2000 Summer Olympics. He represented England and won a bronze medal, at the 1998 Commonwealth Games in Kuala Lumpur.

References

External links

 

1973 births
Living people
British male field hockey players
Olympic field hockey players of Great Britain
Field hockey players at the 2000 Summer Olympics
Commonwealth Games medallists in field hockey
Commonwealth Games bronze medallists for England
1998 Men's Hockey World Cup players
2002 Men's Hockey World Cup players
Field hockey players at the 1998 Commonwealth Games
Medallists at the 1998 Commonwealth Games